Saktigarh may refer to:

 Saktigarh, Siliguri, Jalpaiguri district, West Bengal, India
 Saktigarh, Bardhaman, town in Bardhaman district, West Bengal, India
 Saktigarh railway station, in Bardhaman district.
 Shaktigarh, Uttarakhand, town in Udham Singh Nagar district, Uttarakhand.